Taylorville Municipal Airport is a civil public-use airport in Taylorville, Illinois. It is owned by the City of Taylorville. The airport is located near both Springfield's Abraham Lincoln Capital Airport and Decatur Airport. It has been active since March 1947.

Taylorville Airport received $1.4 million for runway rehabilitation as part of the Rebuild Illinois initiative during the COVID-19 pandemic. The funding specifically went toward repairing runway 9/27. The funding included $1.26 million of state funding and $140,000 of local funding.

Taylorville Municipal Airport has three runways: runway 18/36 is 4001 x 75 ft and is made of asphalt; runway 9R/27L is 3501 x 60 ft and is also asphalt; runway 9L/27R is 1933 x 165 ft and is turf.

For the 12-month period ending August 31, 2019, the airport averages 25 aircraft operations per day: 99% general aviation – split between 67% local and 32% transient general aviation – and 1% air taxi. 14 aircraft are based on the field: 10 single-engine and 2 multiengine airplanes as well as 2 jets. It is the 99th busiest of 323 airports in Illinois.

Besides a terminal and self-serve fuel, airport services include a courtesy car and major airframe and powerplant repair. Multiple hotels and motels are nearby.

References 

Airports in Illinois